Istiaia (before 1913: Ξηροχώρι - Xirochori) is a town and a former municipality in Euboea, Greece. It was named after the ancient town Histiaea, which was mentioned by the ancient Greek poet Homer. Since the 2011 local government reform it is part of the municipality Istiaia-Aidipsos, of which it is the seat and a municipal unit. The municipal unit has an area of 181.299 km2. At the 2011 census the population was 7,091 for the municipal unit and 5,522 for the community.

The town is located in the northwestern end of the island Euboea, 5 km from the north coast, and north of the mountain Telethrio. It was the capital of Istiaia Province until its abolishment in 2006. Visitor attractions of Istiaia include the Museum of Natural History and the church of Agios Nikolaos.

Subdivisions

The municipal unit Istiaia is subdivided into the following communities (constituent villages and population at the 2011 census given in brackets):

Avgaria (pop. 96)
Galatsades (Galatsades, Kamatriades, pop. 148)
Galatsona (pop. 65)
Istiaia (Agios Georgios, Istiaia, Kanatadika, Nea Sinasos, Neochori, pop. 5,522)
Kamaria (pop. 381)
Kokkinomilea (pop. 72)
Kryoneritis (pop. 189)
Milies (pop. 169)
Monokarya (Kato Monokarya, Monokarya, pop. 155)
Voutas (Voutas, Kyparissi, Simia, pop. 294)

Population history

History
Istiaia was named after the ancient town Histiaea, already mentioned by Homer in his Iliad. The old town was situated 2 km west of the present town. Archaeological findings from 2000 BC have been done, suggesting a settlement existed here in the Middle Helladic period.

Near the ancient town, a new town was founded, named Xirochori. Its name was changed into Istiaia in 1913, after the ancient town Histiaea.

References

Drandakis Great Greek Encyclopedia, Vol XIII, p. 268

External links
Official website for Istiaia-Aidipsos
Istiaia Radio Station 
Touristic Directory for Northern Euboea 

Populated places in Euboea